Rosenborg Ballklub is an association football club based in Trondheim, Norway. It is Norway's most successful club, having won the Norwegian Premier League 26 times and the Norwegian Football Cup 12 times. Although founded in 1917, it was not permitted to play Football Association of Norway-sanctioned matches until 1928. The club entered the cup for the first time in 1932, claiming its first title in 1960. Rosenborg joined the top league in 1967 and won the league in the club's inaugural top tier season. It has only spent one season outside the top tier since, which was in 1978. Rosenborg has played 186 matches and 27 seasons in Union of European Football Associations (UEFA) tournaments, starting with the 1965–66 European Cup Winners' Cup. Their only European trophy is the 2008 UEFA Intertoto Cup, with the second-best performance being the quarter-finals of the 1996–97 UEFA Champions League.

The club's record win is 17–0 in a cup match against Buvik in 2003; the league record is 10–0 against Brann in 1996 and the Champions League record is 6–0 against Helsingborg in 2000. In the league, the team had a record 87–20 goal difference in 1997, claimed a record 69 points in 2009 and went undefeated in 2010. Rosenborg was relegated after the 1977 season having won just a single match. The record home attendance is 28,569 spectators at Lerkendal Stadion against Lillestrøm in 1985.

Roar Strand, who played 21 seasons between 1989 and 2010, has played 416 league matches, more than any other Rosenborg player. He has also won the most titles with the club, having won the league 16 times and the cup 5 times. With 151 league goals, Harald Martin Brattbakk is the club's all-time top scorer and was the league's top scorer during six seasons. Sigurd Rushfeldt is the league's all-time top scorer, although he scored a majority of these for Tromsø. Odd Iversen holds the record for most goals in a single match and season, with 6 and 30 respectively. The club received it highest transfer fee for John Carew; they received 75 million Norwegian krone when he was sold to Valencia in 2000.

Honors

Major
1. divisjon / Norwegian Premier League:
 Winners (26): 1967, 1969, 1971, 1985, 1988, 1990, 1992, 1993, 1994, 1995, 1996, 1997, 1998, 1999, 2000, 2001, 2002, 2003, 2004, 2006, 2009, 2010, 2015, 2016, 2017, 2018
Runners-up (7): 1968, 1970, 1973, 1989, 1991, 2013, 2014

Norwegian Football Cup:
 Winners (12): 1960, 1964, 1971, 1988, 1990, 1992, 1995, 1999, 2003, 2015, 2016, 2018
Runners-up (6): 1967, 1972, 1973, 1991, 1998, 2013

Superfinalen:
 Winners (1): 2010

Mesterfinalen:
 Winners (2): 2017, 2018

Intertoto Cup:
 Co-winner (1): 2008

Minor
Minor honors include lower-division league titles and pre-season friendly tournaments.

The double:
 Winners (9): 1971, 1988, 1990, 1992, 1995, 1999, 2003, 2015, 2016, 2018

League of Norway District VIII:
 Winners (1): 1938–39

Trøndelag Class A:
 Winners (1): 1945
 Runners-up (1): 1935, 1936

Third Division:
 Winners (4): 1948–49, 1953–54, 1956–57, 1958–59
 Runners-up (1): 1952–53

Second Division:
 Winners (3): 1959–60, 1966, 1978
 Runners-up (1): 1965

La Manga Cup:
 Winners (3): 1999, 2001, 2003
 Runners-up (1): 2000

Trofeo Santiago Bernabéu:
 Runners-up (1): 2009

Kniksen's Honor Award:
 Winners (1): 1997

Players

Appearances

The following is a list of the ten Rosenborg players with the most appearances in the top league, including their appearances in European football. As no comprehensive statistics for cup appearances exists, the numbers are not included in the total.

Seasons

Goalscorers

 Most goals scored in one season: 30 – Odd Iversen in 1968
 Most goals scored in one game: 6 – Odd Iversen against Vålerengen on 20 October 1968
 Sigurd Rushfeldt is the all-time top scorer in the Norwegian Premier League, with 172 goals. Also the next three places on the list consist of Rosenborg players: Harald Brattbakk (166 goals), Petter Belsvik (159 goals) and Odd Iversen (158 goals). All four have played for multiple top-league clubs.

The following is a list of the ten Rosenborg players who have scored the most top-league goals. It includes their career total for Rosenborg, as well as the years they were top scorer in the club. An asterisk (*) indicates that they were also top scorer in the league for that season. The list also contains the players' goals in European football.  As no comprehensive statistics for cup appearances exists, the numbers are not included in the total.

Most-winning

The following is a list of the most-winning players with Rosenborg. It contains the number of times the player has won the league and cup with the club, as well as the years.

Transfer fee records

The following lists the ten highest transfer fees received by Rosenborg for players sold. It lists the player, the price in million Norwegian krone, the year the transfer took place, the club which bought the player and the country of that club.

Club

Matches
 First match: 2–1 against Falk in mid-July 1918
 First Football Association of Norway sanctioned match: 1928
 First cup match: 0–2 against Kristiansund FK in 1932
 First UEFA match: 3–1 against KR Reykjavík at KR-völlur on 24 August 1965 in the UEFA Cup Winners' Cup

Record wins
 League:  10–0 against Brann on 5 May 1996
 League away:
 7–0 against Strømsgodset on 24 July 1994
 7–0 against Sogndal on 3 August 1997
 Cup: 17–0 against Buvik on 17 May 2003
 Europe:
 7–1 against Astana on 8 August 2007

Record defeats
 Overall: 1–9 against Hibernian on 2 October 1974
 League: 1–8 against Viking on 12 August 1984
 Cup: 0–5 against Molde on 9 August 2009
 Europe: 1–9 against Hibernian on 2 October 1974

Streaks
Longest winning streak in league: 8 matches in 1995, 1999, 2001, 2006 and 2009
Longest unbeaten run in league: 33 matches from 18 October 2009 to 7 November 2010
Longest unbeaten run home in league: 44 matches from 16 October 1994 to 16 May 1998
Longest unbeaten run away in league: 30 matches from 23 March 2009 to 31 October 2010
Longest winning streak from season start in league: 7 matches in 2003

Wins/draws/losses in a season
Most wins in a league season: 20 in 1998 and 2009
Most draws in a league season: 11 in 2010
Most defeats in a league season: 16 in 1977
Fewest wins  in a league season: 1 in 1932, 1951–52 and 1977
Fewest draws in a league season: 0 in 1929, 1930, 1931, 1932, 1933, 1937 and 1937–38
Fewest draws in a top-league season: 1 in 1969
Fewest defeats in a league season: 0 in 2010
Most points in a league season: 69 points in 2009
Fewest points in a league season: 2 points in 4 matches in 1932
Fewest points in a top-league season: 12 points in 22 matches in 1977
Highest league win margin: 15 points in 1995, ahead of Molde

Goals
Most league goals scored in a season: 87 in 1997
Fewest league goals scored in a top league season: 15 in 1970
Fewest league goals conceded in a season: 1 in 1945
Fewest league goals conceded in a top-league season: 5 in 1970
Most league goals conceded in a season: 60 in 1961–62
Best goal difference in a league season: 87–20 in 1997
Worst goal difference in a league season: 17–48 in 1977

In European football

The following is a list of the all-time statistics from Rosenborg's games in the four UEFA tournaments it has participated in, as well as the overall total. The list contains the tournament, the number of seasons (S), games played (P), won (W), drawn (D) and lost (L). The statistics include qualification matches.

Attendance
Attendance statistics only take into account statistics from the 1967 season onwards.
 Home overall: 28,569 against Lillestrøm on 12 October 1985
 League: 28,569 against Lillestrøm on 12 October 1985
 League as all-seater: 22,330 against Odd Grenland on 16 May 2006
 League low: 1,250 against Hødd in 1978
 League season average: 19,903 in 2007
 League season average low: 2,549 in 1978
 League away: 24,894 against Vålerenga at Ullevaal Stadion on 23 October 2005
 Cup: 27,497 against Kongsvinger on 16 September 1990
 Cup Final: 31,135 against Odd Grenland at Ullevaal Stadion on 23 October 1960
 Europe: 22,492 against Rapid Wien on 18 September 1968
 Europe as all-seater: 21,582 against Chelsea on 28 November 2007
 Europe away: 64,870 against Real Madrid on 9 October 2005

References and notes
Notes

Bibliography

References

Record and statistics
Rosenborg BK